Svartfjelljøkelen is a glacier in the municipality of Loppa in Troms og Finnmark, Norway. The glacier has an area of 4.13 square kilometers. The highest point is 1,082 m.a.s.l. and the lowest 414 m.a.s.l.

References

Glaciers of Troms og Finnmark
Loppa